Prentiss may refer to:

People

Given name
 Prentiss Barnes (1925–2006), U.S. singer
 Prentiss M. Brown (1889–1973), Michigan politician
 Robert Prentiss Daniel (1902–1968), U.S. academic
 Prentiss Douglass (1884–1949), U.S. American football coach and player
 Prentiss Hubb (born 1999), American basketball player for Notre Dame
 Prentiss Ingraham (1843–1904), soldier and mercenary
 Prentiss Mellen (1764–1840), Massachusetts jurist
 Prentiss Oakley, Louisiana police officer
 Prentiss Taylor (1907–1991), U.S. artist
 Prentiss Waggner (born 1990), U.S. American football player
 Prentiss Walker (1917–1998), Mississippi politician

Surname
 Adella Prentiss Hughes (1869–1950; nee Prentiss), U.S musician
 Ann Prentiss (1939–2010), U.S. actress
 Anna Marie Prentiss, American archeologist
 Benjamin Prentiss (1819–1901), Union general in American civil war
 Elizabeth Prentiss (1818–1878), U.S. songwriter, poet, writer
 John Holmes Prentiss (1784–1861), New York politician
 Melodye Prentiss, 1968 Playboy model
 Paula Prentiss (born 1938), U.S. actress, wife of Richard Benjamin
 Robert Prentiss (1936-2022), American politician
 Samuel Prentiss (1782–1857), Vermont politician
 Seargent Smith Prentiss (1808–1850), Mississippi politician
 Theodore Prentiss (1818–1906), Wisconsin politician
 William A. Prentiss (1799–1892), Wisconsin politician

Fictional people
 Adelaide Prentiss, a character from the novel One of Us Is Lying by Karen M. McManus
 Amy Prentiss, title character in the American TV series Amy Prentiss 
 Charles Prentiss, senior partner of Prentiss-McCabe in BBC television and radio series Absolute Power
 David Prentiss (Mayor/President), a character from the novel series Chaos Walking
 Emily Prentiss, a character in the American television series Criminal Minds
 Jane Prentiss, a character from the horror-fiction podcast The Magnus Archives
 Nora Prentiss, title character of 1947 film
 Pimli Prentiss, a character from The Dark Tower
 Vanessa Prentiss, a character from The Young and the Restless

Places in the United States
 Prentiss, Kentucky
 Prentiss, Maine
 Prentiss, Mississippi
 Prentiss, Ohio
 Prentiss County, Mississippi

Other uses
 Prentiss Bridge, a covered bridge in Langdon, New Hampshire, U.S.
 Prentiss County School District, Mississippi, U.S.
 Prentiss M. Brown Freeway, Michigan, U.S.
 , a U.S. Navy ship name
 , WWII attack cargo ship
 , WWI tugboat
 Mary Prentiss Inn, Cambridge, Massachusetts, U.S.

See also

 Prentiss House (disambiguation)